Tatsuaki (written: ,  or ) is a masculine Japanese given name. Notable people with the name include:

, Japanese judoka
, Japanese Go player
, Japanese woodworker and lacquerware artist

See also
TATSUAKI, a fashion label by Dan Liu

Japanese masculine given names